Seyfried is a surname of German origin and roughly translates to 'peaceful victory'. Notable persons with that surname include:

 Alois Seyfried (1856–1938) Austro-Hungarian executioner
 Amanda Seyfried (born 1985), American actress
 David Seyfried-Herbert, 19th Baron Herbert (born 1952), British peer
 Gerhard Seyfried (born 1948), German comic artist, cartoonist, and writer
 Gordon Seyfried (born 1937), Major League Baseball pitcher
 Ignaz von Seyfried (1776–1841), Austrian musician, conductor and composer
 Josef Seyfried (1895–1956), Czech equestrian
 Thomas Garcia Seyfried (born 1994), French footballer
 Thomas N. Seyfried, American professor of biology, genetics, and biochemistry.
 Vincent F. Seyfried (1918–2012), American historian

See also 
 Seifried Helbling

German-language surnames